The Isham Henderson House, on Main Cross Rd. in New Castle in Henry County, Kentucky, was built .  It was listed on the National Register of Historic Places in 1987.  The listing included two contributing buildings (a stone house and a frame dependency) and a contributing structure (a root cellar).

The house is a six-bay one-story hip roof dry stone house with a rear ell.  It has nine-stone voussoirs without keystones.  It had Federal/Greek transitional-style woodwork.

References

National Register of Historic Places in Henry County, Kentucky
Federal architecture in Kentucky
Greek Revival architecture in Kentucky
Houses completed in 1830
Houses on the National Register of Historic Places in Kentucky
Houses in Henry County, Kentucky
1830 establishments in Kentucky